This is a list of mayors of Denizli, Turkey.

References

 
Denizli